Cravo may refer to:

Christian Cravo, Brazilian photographer
J. Cravo (José Craveirinha) (1922–2003), Mozambican journalist, story writer and poet
João Cravo (born 1929), Portuguese rower
Mário Cravo Neto (1947–2009), Brazilian photographer, sculptor and draughtsman

See also
Cravo Norte, town and municipality in the Arauca Department, Colombia
Cravo Norte River, river of Colombia
Cravo Sur River, river of Colombia
Carvao (disambiguation)
Craveiro
Cravero